Eofelis is an extinct genus of small nimravid (false saber-toothed cats). They were catlike creatures that evolved in parallel with true cats but are not a part of the true cat lineage and have left no living descendants.

Fossils have been found in the phosphorites of Quercy, France. It was recently determined that there were two distinct species of Eofelis from old collections, E. edwardsii being the most abundant.

E. giganteus was very large, almost twice the size of E. edwardsii.

References

External links
Extinct Carnivore
New Eofelis Species
Taxonomic Data

Nimravidae
Oligocene feliforms
Oligocene mammals of Europe
Paleogene France
Fossils of France
Quercy Phosphorites Formation
Prehistoric carnivoran genera